Cladophantis is a genus of moths of the family Xyloryctidae. Its species occur in Africa.

Species
 Cladophantis pristina Meyrick, 1925
 Cladophantis spilozeucta Meyrick, 1927
 Cladophantis xylophracta Meyrick, 1918

References 

Xyloryctidae
Xyloryctidae genera